Michael McHugh may refer to:

Michael McHugh (born 1935), Australian judge
Michael McHugh (footballer) (born 1971), Irish footballer
Mike McHugh (born 1965), American ice hockey player